Allenby was an important copper-mining company town in the Similkameen Country of the Southern Interior of British Columbia, Canada, just south of the town of Princeton.  It was for a short time the location of the Copper Mountain post office but that name was reinstated to its original site when the neighbouring Copper Mountain mining town, affiliated with the same mine (the Copper Mountain Mine of the Canadian Copper Company), was revived.

Allenby was named for Edmund Henry Hynman Allenby (1861-1936), British field marshal in Egypt and Palestine in World War I (he was the first Viscount Allenby, 1919, later Lord Allenby).

See also
Copper Mountain, British Columbia
John Fall Allison

References

BC Govt MINFILE Record Summary "Copper Mountain"

Similkameen Country
Ghost towns in British Columbia
Company towns in Canada
Mining communities in British Columbia